Trussardi is an Italian luxury fashion house based in Milan, Italy, and specialized in leather goods, ready-to-wear, perfumes, and accessories.

Trussardi was founded in 1911 as a leather glove manufacturer, and expanded its line to additional leather goods in the 1970s after Nicola Trussardi took over from his uncle. In the 1980s the company started production of ready-to-wear clothing, in addition to products including perfumes and jeans. By the 1990s Trussardi was selling internationally, with its largest markets being Italy and Japan.

Sebastian Suhl is CEO of Trussardi since 2020, and Benjamin Huseby and Serhat Işık creative directors since 2021.

History

Early days
Trussardi was founded in 1911 by Dante Trussardi as a leather glove maker, selling to the public and to the Italian army during World War II until it surrendered to Allied Forces. After his death, Dante's son Giordano took over the business.  In 1970, Nicola Trussardi took over from his father Giordano, after his brother Dante (named after his grandfather) died in a firearms accident.
His wife Marialuisa also joined the company as the creative director. During the 1970s, Trussardi diversified into other leather goods and accessories, and eventually non-leather apparel (wallets, suitcases, belts and shoes), along with a new greyhound logo. Nicola Trussardi took full control of the company after the death of his father.

Expansion
The company released its first perfume "Trussardi", in 1980, and "Trussardi Uomo" for men in 1983. It also launched the first Trussardi women's ready-to-wear line in 1983, followed by a men's line in 1984. Trussardi Jeans was founded in 1986. The company later added sport and home lines. By 1985, the brand had 120 stores around the world. The company also developed interior designs for private aircraft and helicopters.

Around this time, Trussardi entered the US market, with sections in department stores in addition to boutiques, and initial franchise locations in Beverly Hills, Atlanta, Miami, and San Francisco. The first Bloomingdales location opened in 1985, with opera singer Luciano Pavarotti in attendance for the grand opening. In 1989, the company launched its first eyewear line. In 1993, the company opened a research and development center in Brindisi, which initially focused on raw material research, new fabrics, and changing packaging to be more environmentally friendly.
The three initial lines for the collection were Trussardi Sport, Jeans, and T-store, each produced by the company Sosab—owned by Nicola Trussardi and operating out of Modena, Italy. The T-Stores started in 1996 and sold the company's lifestyle line: jeans, sports lines, bicycles, tableware, and confections. The first three stores opened in 1995 in Bangkok, Hong Kong, and Seoul. The company's first New York City store opened in 1996. That year, the turnover for the company, including licenses, was $530 million. They also opened a new store in Milan within Nicola Trussardi's redeveloped Marino Alla Scala across from the La Scala opera hall. By this time the company had seven fragrances, with about one third of fragrance sales being done in Europe and two-thirds abroad.

In 1998, Trussardi launched a new eyewear line, with both prescription and sun glasses. In 1992, Trussardi licensed its Trussardi Levriero and Trussardi Action lines to the Japanese company C. Itoh for about $1.4 billion over five years. At the time, Japan accounted for about 70% of the company's total exports out of Italy, and there were about 200 Trussardi Levriero stores in the country. Following its partnership with C. Itoh, Nicola Trussardi founded Teijin Ltd, intending it to be Trussardi's long-term partner in the country. In 2003, Trussardi took on Mitsui as its partner in Japan, ending its relationship with Teijin.

2000s
Francesco Trussardi, Nicola's son, became chairman of the brand after his father's death in 1999. His sister Beatrice also took a leadership position with the company. After her brother's death in 2003, Beatrice became president and CEO of the fashion house, staying president until Maria Luisa Trussardi took over the position. In 2006, the brand hired Eric Wright, who had previously designed for Fendi, to be the house's head designer. In 2008, Trussardi launched the super high-end line of brand Trussardi dal 1911, designed by Milan Vukmirovic. In 2011, Trussardi released the home décor collection MY Design, named for the initials of industrial designer Michael Young and inspired by Trussardi's designs of the 1980s and 1990s. In 2011, Umit Benan Sahin became the label's creative director, and in 2013, Sahin was replaced by Gaia Trussardi. Prior to becoming creative director for the mainline collections, Gaia had already served as the creative director for Tru Trussardi and Trussardi Jeans. For the 40th anniversary of their logo, Yuko Shimizu produced an animated short film entitled "Sky Watcher". 

In 2017, Trussardi launched its latest men's fragrance Riflesso. Said to have ambrosial wafts of woody and oriental notes. In April 2018, Gaia Trussardi stepped down as creative director of the fashion house.

In February 2019, the asset management company Quattro R acquired 60% of Trussardi. A few months later, Maela Mandelli (former PVH director) was named CEO of the company. Then in October 2020, Sebastian Suhl was named CEO of Trussardi. In May 2021, Benjamin Huseby and Serhat Işık were named creative directors Trussardi.

Collections, partnerships and licenses
In May 2021, with the appointment of Serhat Işık and Benjamin A. Huseby as new creative directors, the brand has started a new course under a single label, Trussardi.

Collections
Trussardi: Trussardi is the mainline collection of the fashion house, which releases the group's ready-to-wear line and couture collections. It designs clothing for both men and women. The 2014 collection was partially inspired by the films of Jean-Luc Godard and François Truffaut. Nicole Phelps wrote of the Trussardi line that, "The Trussardi family business is one of Italy's ultimate heritage houses, with a century-plus history of leather goods artisanship."

Past collections
 Tru Trussardi was the house's more casual collection, with its own stand alone stores. Tru Trussardi releases clothing and accessories. As part of the corporate restructuring carried out in 2016, the Tru Trussardi line was closed.
 Trussardi Jeans is the denim line for the fashion house, founded in 1986. The line produces casual wear for both men and women.

Partnerships
In the 2013–2014 season, Trussardi began designing the off-field uniforms for Juventus Football Club.

In 2014, Trussardi formed a partnership with Morellato for the Trussardi Orologi line of Swiss-made timepieces. That year, the company also formed a partnership with Tollegno 1900 to produce a line of underwear, nightwear and beachwear.

In 2016, Trussardi partnered with Lardini to create the men’s formalwear line Trussardi Elegance, which was inaugurated in Milan with the fall/winter 2017–2018 collection.

The brand also has a perfume line, Trussardi Parfums, which has expanded to 28 varieties.

Licenses

Trussardi Junior: Trussardi Junior is the fashion house's children's clothing line, first released in 1983 alongside the company's first ready-to-wear collections. There are two collections for Trussardi Junior, the main collection and the top collection. In 2013, Trussardi licensed the creation of children's clothing line Trussardi Junior to Italian fashion house Pinco Pallino through 2018. The company's recent partnership with Brave Kid (of OTB group) was launched with the first fall/winter 2017-2018 collection.

Trussardi Casa: Trussardi Casa, the collection's current furniture line, was released and presented in 2014 at the Milan Furniture Fair. Trussardi has a licensed partnership with Luxury Living Group to produce furniture under the Trussardi Casa brand. In 2016, the company launched a partnership with Dynamic Yachts to produce a collection designed for D4 vessels through Trussardi Casa.

In 2015, the brand licensed De Rigo to design, manufacture and distribute its eyewear line.

Fashion Streetwear Italia has the license to produce the collection Trussardi for Your Dog.

Ristorante Trussardi Alla Scala
Founded in 2006, Ristorante Trussardi Alla Scala has received two Michelin stars. The first was received in 2008 and the next in 2009, given to executive chef Andrea Berton. Attached is the Café Trussardi, which houses an open courtyard overlooking the square, and its glass walls also face Teatro alla Scala and the other buildings on the promenade.

References

External links
Trussardi

Italian companies established in 1978
Clothing brands of Italy
Clothing companies established in 1911
Italian suit makers
Fashion accessory brands
High fashion brands
Luxury brands
Manufacturing companies of Italy
Menswear designers
Privately held companies of Italy
Design companies established in 1911
Companies based in Bergamo